Cirsonella weldii, common name the shiny liotia, is a species of sea snail, a marine gastropod mollusk in the family Skeneidae.

Description
The diameter of the shell attains 2 mm. The shining, white shell has a globosely turbinate shape. It is narrowly umbilicated, semi-opaque, and smooth. The four whorls are convex. The body whorl is large and rounded at the periphery. The aperture is circular. The peristome is continuous and slightly thickened on the columellar margin.

Distribution
This marine species occurs off New South Wales,  Queensland, South Australia, Tasmania, Victoria, Australia.

References

 Angas, G.F. 1877. Descriptions of two genera and twenty species of marine shells from New South Wales. Proceedings of the Zoological Society of London 1877: 34-40, pl. 5
 Cotton, B.C. 1945. Southern Australian Gastropoda. Part 1. Streptoneura. Transactions of the Royal Society of South Australia 69(1): 150-171
 Laseron, C. 1954. Revision of the Liotiidae of New South Wales. The Australian Zoologist 12(1): 1-25, figs 1-49a
 Cotton, B.C. 1959. South Australian Mollusca. Archaeogastropoda. Handbook of the Flora and Fauna of South Australia. Adelaide : South Australian Government Printer 449 pp

External links
 To World Register of Marine Species
 

weldii
Gastropods described in 1877